Donald Lamont Jack (6 December 1924 – 2 June 2003) was an English and Canadian novelist and playwright.

Life
Jack was born in Radcliffe, Bury, England and grew up in Britain, attending the well regarded Bury Grammar School and Marr College and later serving in the RAF in World War II (1943–47).

After the war he emigrated to Canada in 1951, and became a Canadian citizen in 1964. From 1955 to 1957 he was a scriptwriter for Crawley Films. After 1957 he became a full-time freelance writer.

He wrote for the stage, radio, and for television programs such as General Motors Theatre, The Unforeseen, Playdate, Hatch's Mill, The Forest Rangers, and On Camera, but he is most famous for his novels, the Bandy Papers, which recount the humorous adventures of Bartholomew Bandy, a World War I fighter pilot. His play The Canvas Barricade was the first Canadian play produced at the Stratford Festival of Canada. Other stage plays included Exit Muttering, Crash, and Minuet for Brass Band. He had 39 TV plays produced, 22 radio plays, and numerous documentaries. Most of Jack's book-length works are being re-published, or published for the first time, by Sybertooth.

Jack died of a stroke at his home in Warwickshire, England in June 2003.

The Bandy Papers series 

Three Cheers for Me – 1962 (Winner of the 1963 Stephen Leacock Award)
Three Cheers for Me (revised & expanded edition) – 1973
That's Me in the Middle – 1973 (Winner of the 1974 Stephen Leacock Award)
It's Me Again - 1975 (Also published as two volumes, It's Me Again & Me Among the Ruins)
Me Bandy, You Cissie - 1979 (Winner of the 1980 Stephen Leacock Award)
Me Too - 1983
This One's on Me - 1987
Me So Far – 1989
Hitler Versus Me: The Return of Bartholomew Bandy – 1996
Stalin Versus Me – 2005
Hitler Versus Me paperback combining H vs M with the author's novelette, "Where Did Rafe Madison Go?" – 2006
Me Bandy, You Cissie paperback combining the novel with the author's radio play Banner's Headline – 2009
Three Cheers for Me 50th anniversary edition of the original 1962 version, with a foreword by Paul Marlowe – 2011

Other published works 
Exit Muttering – 1972
Sinc, Betty and the Morning Man – 1977 (non-fiction)
Rogues, Rebels, and Geniuses: The Story of Canadian Medicine – 1981 (non-fiction)
The Canvas Barricade – 2007 (stage play)

Stageplays 
 Humbly, for Fyodor (1953)
 Minuet for Brass Band (1953) A 3-act play first performed at the Canadian Theatre School in Toronto, founded by Sterndale Bennett.
 Flamacue Serenade
 The Canvas Barricade (1961) A 2-act comedy about an artist defying materialism. Set on the Quebec-Ontario border, and in Toronto. Performed in 1961 at the Stratford Festival, where it was the first original Canadian play performed. Music by Harry Freedman
 Exit Muttering (1962) A 2-act comedy first performed at the Grenville Street Playhouse, directed by Hugh Webster, with set design by Vincent Vaitiekunas. Published 1974.
 Reckless (1969/1971)
 Folly (1985) Alternate titles: Love in Business Hours; Pension Play.
 Blast (1988) Comedy about espionage at an English country house.
 Crash A 2-act comedy about a timpanist who inherits a funeral home. First performed at the Ontario Playwrights' Showcase.

Radio Plays 
 Three Cheers for Me (CBC Theatre 10:30, 1972)
 Your Tiny Head is Frozen (for CBC Stage)
 Grave Tidings (for Sunday Theatre)
 Banner's Headline
 More Joy in Heaven (dramatization of Morley Callaghan's novel for Theatre 10:30)

Notes

External links 
Web site about Donald Jack's books

1924 births
2003 deaths
Canadian male novelists
20th-century Canadian dramatists and playwrights
20th-century Canadian novelists
Canadian non-fiction writers
English humorists
British emigrants to Canada
20th-century English novelists
English dramatists and playwrights
English non-fiction writers
Naturalized citizens of Canada
People from Radcliffe, Greater Manchester
People educated at Bury Grammar School
Royal Air Force personnel of World War II
Stephen Leacock Award winners
Writers from Ontario
People educated at Marr College
Canadian male dramatists and playwrights
English male novelists
20th-century Canadian male writers
Canadian male non-fiction writers
English male non-fiction writers
20th-century non-fiction writers
20th-century English male writers